The Women's team pursuit competition at the 2019 World Single Distances Speed Skating Championships was held on 8 February 2019.

Results
The race was started at 17:31.

References

Women's team pursuit